Küçükorhan is a village in the Orhaneli district of Bursa Province in Turkey.

References

Villages in Orhaneli District